Martha C. Howell is an American historian. She is Miriam Champion Emerita Professor of History at Columbia University.

Biography 
Howell received her B.A. from Georgetown University, and both her M.A. and PhD. from Columbia University. She taught at Rutgers University before joining the Columbia University faculty in 1989, serving as Director of the university's Institute for Research on Women and Gender from 1989 to 1995. Her specialization is the socioeconomic and women's history in Northern Europe during the late Medieval and Early modern centuries, focusing on the Netherlands, northern France, and Germany.

She received a Guggenheim Fellowship in 2002 in the field of Medieval history. She received an honorary doctorate from Ghent University and was elected a member of the Royal Flemish Academy of Belgium for Science and the Arts.

References 

Living people
Georgetown University alumni
Columbia Graduate School of Arts and Sciences alumni
Members of the Royal Flemish Academy of Belgium for Science and the Arts
Rutgers University faculty
Columbia University faculty
American women historians
Historians of Europe
20th-century American historians
21st-century American historians
American medievalists
Year of birth missing (living people)